Mene purdyi an extinct species of ray-finned fish in the genus Mene, from Late Thanetian-aged marine deposits in  northern Peru. M. purdyi is currently known only from a single skull and a few post-cranial bones.

References 

 "A new species of Mene (Perciformes: Menidae) from the Paleocene of South America, with notes on paleoenvironment and a brief review of menid fishes." 

†Mene purdyi
Paleocene fish
Thanetian life
Prehistoric fish of South America
Paleogene Peru
Fossils of Peru
Fossil taxa described in 2005